Nannostomus, (from the Greek: nanos = small, and the Latin: stomus = relating to the mouth), is a genus of fish belonging to the characin family Lebiasinidae. All of the species in this genus are known as pencil fish, a popular name that was first only applied to two species in the 1920s, Nannostomus unifasciatus and Nannostomus eques. By the late 1950s, the term would come to be applied to all members of the genus. Several species have become popular aquarium fish due to their attractive coloration, unique shape, and interesting demeanor.

Taxonomy
The genus Nannostomus was first erected by Günther in 1872 with the type species, Nannostomus beckfordi. In 1876, Steindachner described three more species, Nannostomus unifasciatus, Nannostomus eques (pictured below), and Nannostomus trifasciatus (pictured above). In 1909, Carl H. Eigenmann described Nannostomus marginatus, Nannostomus minimus, and Nannostomus harrisoni. All but N. minimus have been popular with aquarists since the early 20th century, partly due to enthusiastic articles written about them and photographs taken by William T. Innes that were published as early as 1933. Over the years, the genus was split by subsequent authors into other genera, including Poecilobrycon and Nannobrycon. After nearly a century of debate on the subject, Dr. Stanley H. Weitzman and Dr. J. Stanley Cobb restored earlier taxonomy and expanded upon it, unifying all species under Nannostomus in 1975. This comprehensive revision of the genus has now been widely accepted. Dr. Weitzman is also responsible for describing five of the more recently introduced species, Nannostomus marilynae, Nannostomus limatus, Nannostomus nitidus, Nannostomus britskii, and Nannostomus anduzei. Nineteen species are now known, most of which are also familiar to aquarists. Several other unidentified Nannostomus species have been imported over the years; many were found as bycatch with other small characins, but their taxonomic status is yet to be determined.

Species
The 19 currently recognized species in this genus are:
 Nannostomus anduzei Fernández & S. H. Weitzman, 1987
 Nannostomus beckfordi Günther, 1872 (golden pencilfish)
 Nannostomus bifasciatus Hoedeman, 1954 (two-lined pencilfish,whiteside pencilfish)
 Nannostomus britskii S. H. Weitzman, 1978 (spotstripe pencilfish)
 Nannostomus digrammus (Fowler, 1913) (two-stripe pencilfish)
 Nannostomus eques Steindachner, 1876 (brown pencilfish,diptail)
 Nannostomus espei (Meinken, 1956) (Espe's pencilfish,barred pencilfish)
 Nannostomus grandis Zarske, 2011
 Nannostomus harrisoni (C. H. Eigenmann, 1909) (Harrison's pencilfish,blackstripe pencilfish)
 Nannostomus limatus S. H. Weitzman, 1978 (elegant pencilfish)
 Nannostomus marginatus C. H. Eigenmann, 1909 (dwarf pencilfish)
 Nannostomus marilynae S. H. Weitzman & Cobb, 1975 (Marilyn's pencilfish,greenstripe pencilfish)
 Nannostomus minimus C. H. Eigenmann, 1909 (least pencilfish)
 Nannostomus mortenthaleri Paepke & Arendt, 2001 (coral-red pencilfish)
 Nannostomus nigrotaeniatus Zarske, 2013
 Nannostomus nitidus S. H. Weitzman, 1978 (shining pencilfish)
 Nannostomus rubrocaudatus Zarske, 2009(purple pencilfish)
 Nannostomus trifasciatus Steindachner, 1876 (three-stripe pencilfish)
 Nannostomus unifasciatus Steindachner, 1876 (one-line pencilfish)

Description

Most species are slender, pencil-shaped fish ranging in size from under 1 to about 2 in long. N. marginatus, N. rubrocaudatus, and N. mortenthaleri possess shortened, blockier outlines reminiscent of pencil stubs. All but one species, Nannostomus espei, possess one to five horizontal black or brown stripes with gold or silver iridescence appearing dorsal to the primary stripe. Most also display red, orange, or maroon highlights in their fins, and many have flashes of these colors on their flanks as well. The recently described N. mortenthaleri and N. rubrocaudatus are especially vividly colored. For N. espei alone, horizontal stripes are only weakly present and are supplanted by five dark comma-shaped blotches. This pattern is assumed by other species at night, but only N. espei displays the pattern permanently and in daylight. The adipose fin is present in some species and absent in others, while in certain species, such as N. eques, it may be present or absent within the species. All swim in a horizontal attitude except N. unifasciatus and N. eques, which assume an oblique, 'snout-up' posture. A range of sexual dimorphism occurs in the genus, with males being more brilliantly colored in some species, especially with regard to color present in the fins, and far less evident in other species. However, a reliable indicator of gender for most of the species rests in the anal fin of adult males, which is enlarged and elongated (as in N. espei, N. eques, etc.) and/or the anal fin of males is more colorful (as in N. harrisoni, N. marginatus, etc.). The popular aquarium species, N. trifasciatus, is an exception in this regard.

Distribution
The genus has a vast distribution in South America, from Colombia, Venezuela, and the Guyanas in the north, to the southern Amazon basin and Bolivia in the south, to Peru in the west, and Belém, Brazil, in the east. Several of the individual species have a distribution nearly as vast. As a result, many of the species are polymorphic and manifest marked color variations depending on the population. Over the years, some of these color variants have been erroneously described as separate species. Such names as 'Nannostomus ocellatus', 'N. anomalus' and 'N. auratus', among many others, are now known to be junior synonyms for the various species. To date, only two species, N. beckfordi and N. harrisoni, have been commercially raised for the aquarium trade in fisheries, mostly in Asia. All of the remaining species that find their way to home aquaria are wild-caught from South American waters.

In the aquarium

Nannostomus species thrive in home aquaria when provided with soft, moderately acidic water, low nitrate levels, and temperatures in the range of 22 to 28 °C. The addition of aquatic plants, including floating varieties, is recommended. The latter reduces the likelihood of fish jumping, which is a common occurrence for some of the species, especially N. espei and N. unifasciatus. They should be kept in schools of at least six. If kept in a community aquarium, the best tankmates are other species of Nannostomus, small peaceful characins, and corydoras. Aquaria with a strong water current, large tankmates, or swift-moving species are contraindicated. If kept in a thickly planted single-species aquarium with the above water parameters, most species will spawn, eggs will not be eaten, and the fry will be found among the floating plants. Baby brine shrimp, live or frozen, and other small-sized foods are required for both fry and adults. They are also avid biofilm grazers and, for most of the species, algae are under-reported staples of their diet. In most species, the males establish small territories and defend them. Their defensive actions are usually harmless, but in two species, N. mortenthaleri and N. trifasciatus, antagonistic behavior directed at conspecifics can have deleterious results if sufficient space and plant cover are not provided. Once acclimated to the aquarium and provided with suitable conditions, they are hardy, often living for five or more years.

References
 Introduction To The Fish Families 2004. Popular Freshwater Tropical Fish. Accessed on June 24, 2005.
 
 Innes, Dr William T. EXOTIC AQUARIUM FISHES, 1st edition. Innes Publishing Co. Philadelphia, 1935
 Weitzman, Dr. Stanley H. and Cobb, Dr. J. Stanley, A Revision of the South American Fishes of the Genus Nannostomus, Smithsonian Contributions to Zoology, #186. Smithsonian Institution Press. Washington, D.C. 1975.
 Weitzman, Dr. Stanley H. Review of South American Characid Fishes of Subtribe Nannostomina, Proceedings of the United States National Museum, Smithsonian Press. Washington, D.C. 1966
 Weitzman, Dr. Stanley H. Three New Species of Fishes of the Genus Nannostomus from the Brazilian States of Para and Amazonas, Smithsonian Contributions to Zoology, #263. Smithsonian Institution Press. Washington, D.C. 1978.

Lebiasinidae
Fishkeeping
Freshwater fish of South America
Taxa named by Albert Günther
Vertebrates of Guyana